"Komodo (Save a Soul)" is a song by Italian trance producer Mauro Picotto. It was released in July 2000 as the fourth single from his album, The Album. The song had a great success in many countries and reached the top 10 in Austria, Germany, Ireland and Switzerland.

It features samples from Deep Forest's "Sweet Lullaby".

The music video for the song features Mauro Picotto posing as a detective and travelling to stop a mysterious woman from killing men she meets.

Track listing
 "Komodo" (Video Edit) - 3:25
 "Komodo" (Megavoices Claxixx Mix) - 8:15
 "Komodo" (Tea Mix) - 7:53
 "Komodo" (Megamind Remix) - 7:09
 "Komodo" (Saccoman Mix) - 6:53
 "Komodo" (Alternative Mix) - 6:19

Charts

Weekly charts

Year-end charts

Certifications

References

2000 songs
2000 singles
Italian electronic songs
Trance songs